Bezeredi or Bezerédi is a surname. Notable people with the surname include:

Gyula Bezerédi (1858–1925), Hungarian sculptor
Lujo Bezeredi (1898–1979), Croatian-Hungarian sculptor and painter

See also
Bezeréd, village in Zala County in the south-western region of Hungary